Steve McBride may refer to:

Steve McBride (Shameless), fictional character from British TV drama Shameless
Steve McBride (politician), Northern Irish politician